Pardosa lugubris is a wolf spider species with Palearctic distribution.

See also 
 List of Lycosidae species

References 

lugubris
Spiders of Europe
Palearctic spiders
Spiders described in 1802